The Queen Anne's Bounty Act 1706 (6 Ann c 24) was an Act of the Parliament of England. It is one of the Queen Anne's Bounty Acts 1706 to 1870.

The whole Act was repealed by section 6 of, and Schedule 2 to, the First Fruits and Tenths Measure 1926 (No 5).

Section 6
This section was repealed by section 1 of, and the Schedule to, the Statute Law Revision Act 1887.

References
Halsbury's Statutes,

Acts of the Parliament of England